Broughton Skeog (NX4554444071) was a railway station that was located near level crossing gates over a minor road on the Wigtownshire Railway branch line, from Newton Stewart, of the Portpatrick and Wigtownshire Joint Railway. It served a rural area in Wigtownshire and was named after the nearby farm. Although the station closed as far back as 1885 the line was not closed to passenger services until 1950, and to goods in 1964.

History
The Portpatrick and Wigtownshire Joint Railway was formed from the amalgamation of two railway companies: The Portpatrick Railway and the Wigtownshire Railway, which got into financial difficulties; they merged and were taken over.

The station stood close to a controlled level crossing and was reached by a short lane which Ordnance Survey maps show had a crossing keeper's hut. After the station was closed an unusual siding remained for some years with centrally positioned points. Signals controlling the crossing may have been housed within the small building shown on the map. By 1907 the signals and siding had been removed.

Other stations 
 Newton Stewart – junction
 Causewayend
 Wigtown
 Kirkinner
 Whauphill
 Sorbie
 Millisle
 Garlieston
 Whithorn
 List of closed railway stations in Britain

References 
Notes

Sources
 
 Casserley, H.C.(1968). Britain's Joint Lines. Shepperton: Ian Allan. .

External links
 Disused stations 
 Photograph of Broughton Skeog station site
 Broughton Skeog site looking north

Disused railway stations in Dumfries and Galloway
Former Portpatrick and Wigtownshire Joint Railway stations
Railway stations in Great Britain opened in 1877
Railway stations in Great Britain closed in 1885